This is the order of battle for the Battle of Villers-Bocage, a World War II battle on 13 June 1944 between British and German forces in Normandy, France as part of Operation Perch.

British order of battle
The 22nd Armoured Brigade group, was made up of Corps and Divisional troops from XXX Corps and the 7th Armoured Division as well as elements of the divisional 22nd Armoured Brigade and 131st (Queens) Infantry Brigade.

The Brigade group was placed under the command of the 22nd Armoured Brigade commanding officer, Brigadier W. R. N. "Looney" Hinde.

 XXX Corps - Lieutenant-General G. C. Bucknall
 7th Armoured Division - Major-General G. W. E. J. Erskine
 22nd Armoured Brigade group (Brigadier W. R. N. Hinde)
 1st Battalion Rifle Brigade
 A Company (minus Scout platoon), C and I Companies
 Support Company, one AT Section attached to each rifle company
 1/5th Battalion Queen's Royal Regiment (West Surrey)
 A, B, C and D Companies
 1/7th Battalion Queen's Royal Regiment (West Surrey)
 A, B, C and D Companies
 4th County of London Yeomanry (Sharpshooters) (Cromwell, Sherman Firefly and M5 Stuart tanks)
 Headquarters Troop
 Reconnaissance Troop
 A, B and C Squadrons
 5th Regiment, Royal Horse Artillery (Sexton self-propelled gun)
 C, G and K Batteries
 5th Royal Tank Regiment (Cromwell, Firefly and M5 Stuarts)
 A, B and C Squadrons
 8th (King's Royal Irish) Hussars (Cromwell)
 Headquarters Troop
 A and B Squadrons
 11th Hussars (Prince Albert's Own) (Daimler Armoured Car)
 Headquarters Troop
 C Squadron
 65th (Norfolk Yeomanry) Anti-Tank Regiment, Royal Artillery
 260th Anti Tank Battery (M10 3in SP Gun )

German order of battle
 I SS Panzer Corps - SS-Oberst-Gruppenführer (General) Josef Dietrich
 Panzer-Lehr-Division - Generalleutnant (Major-general) Fritz Bayerlein
 Panzer Lehr Regiment 130 (Panzer IV)
 SS Heavy Panzer Battalion 101 (Schwere SS-Panzer-Abteilung 101) (SS-Obersturmbannführer Heinz von Westernhagen)
 1st Panzerkompanie (Tiger I) Rolf Möbius
 2nd Panzerkompanie (Tiger I) Michael Wittmann
 4th Escort Company
 XLVII Panzer Corps -  General der Panzertruppen (lieutenant-general) Hans Freiherr von Funck
 2nd Panzer Division (elements) - Major-General Heinrich Freiherr von Lüttwitz

See also

 List of orders of battle

Notes and references
Notes

Citations

Bibliography

External links

World War II orders of battle
Military history of Normandy
Battle for Caen
Villers-Bocage
Battles of World War II involving Germany